Dorel Bernard (born 2 March 1974) is a Romanian former professional footballer who played as a defender. In his career Bernard played mainly for teams from Suceava County, such as: Bucovina Suceava, Foresta Fălticeni and Cetatea Suceava, but he also played in more than 100 matches for Politehnica Iași, club whose captain was for several times.

Honours
Politehnica Iași
Divizia B: 2003–04

Cetatea Suceava
Liga III: 2007–08

References

External links
 

1974 births
Living people
People from Suceava County
Romanian footballers
Association football defenders
Liga I players
Liga II players
FC Politehnica Iași (1945) players